Pirama may refer to:
 Pirama, Chios, a village in Greece
 Pirama (Sicily), an archaeological site in Italy